Erkna Lighthouse is a coastal lighthouse located in the municipality of Giske, Møre og Romsdal, Norway. It was established in 1869, and automated in 1988.

See also

 List of lighthouses in Norway
 Lighthouses in Norway

References

External links
 Norsk Fyrhistorisk Forening 

Lighthouses completed in 1869
Lighthouses in Møre og Romsdal
Giske
1869 establishments in Norway